Fawn Rogers is an American contemporary multidisciplinary artist. She works within painting, photography, video, and sculptural installation. She has work shown in museums and galleries, alongside non-traditional locations on four continents.

Work 
In 2014 Rogers' works from "Visible Light" and paintings from "I Love You And That Makes Me God," were on view at HATCH, while a version of  "I Love You And That Makes Me God," was displayed as a 50-story LED public installation on the American Eagle building in Time Square, New York.

Rogers' first solo gallery exhibition, "Violent Garden", opened on September 9, 2017 at The Lodge Gallery in Los Angeles.

SUBJECT (2016) 
In 2016, Rogers debuted "SUBJECT" at MOAH (Museum of Art and History) in Lancaster, California. "SUBJECT" was inspired by a produce truck driveshaft and the most fertile soil (Terra Petra) found in California. The installation created a propositional composition of a closed system with man-made objects, nature and the by-product of biotechnology. Rogers invited viewers to watch super weeds grow from the soil under the resurfaced produce truck drive shafts where organic and inorganic compounds slowly reach chemical equilibrium through the sedimentation of time, as nature gradually re-established its ecological balance beyond our existence. As part of the installation Rogers had invited 52 California artists to represent produce currently farmed in California as works of art on a deck of oversized playing cards.

Hero (2015) 
"Hero", a live stream video installation from July 31 through August 6, 2015 featured a live rat in a glass tank chewing on a pile of $20 bills, with a coalescence of digital imagery in the background. The work questioned how America creates heroes, and drew on Andrew Jackson as the force behind the Native American Removal Act  and his extreme wealth accrued through slavery.

Court (2015) 
In May 2015, Rogers debuted "Court" at NADA (New Art Dealers Alliance) Art Fair and at Select Art Fair in New York City, during Frieze Art Week. "Court" is a series of 54 original acrylic and graphite paintings featuring images of art collectors chosen at random. Each collector is presented as a playing card. "Court" debuted as both standard decks of playing cards and oversized playing cards at NADA Art Fair and Select Art Fair during the 2015 Frieze Art Week in New York City.

I Love You And That Makes Me God (2014) 
"I Love You And That Makes Me God" is video art exploring the themes of convictions, power, and intimacy. The project includes a vast range of participants who are filmed as they each state the expression, "I love you and that makes me god."

In 2014 Rogers presented a text version of "I Love You And That Makes Me God" on a 50-story LED light installation in Times Square using the facade of the American Eagle Building. KCET reported the words lit up Time Square, "taking this very intimate statement and giving a powerful public presence."

Visible Light (2014) 
"The "Visible Light" series are images created by natural projection of electromagnetic light through purified water using a 4-foot vertical prism, then photographed with a high-powered lens. Each image represents a few millimeters of light taken from the original photographs, then enlarged up to 25 feet onto various archival substrates.  Rogers created site specific works from the series for the Alexandria Care Center, which houses Medicare patients.

Solo exhibitions
 2022 – "Your Perfect Plastic Heart," Wilding Cran Gallery, Los Angeles, CA
 2020 – "Poisonous Harmony," Visions in Light: Windows on the Wallis, Annenberg Center for the Performing Arts, Beverly Hills, California
 2017 – "Violent Garden", The Lodge Gallery, Los Angeles, California
 2016 – "SUBJECT", Museum of Art and History, Lancaster, California
 2015 – "COURT", Select Art Fair, New York City, New York
 2014 – "Visible Light" and "I Love You And That Makes Me God", HATCH, Los Angeles, California
 2013 – "Untitled" Siite-Specific Installation, Dawit Yohannes/World Bank, Juba, South Sudan

Publications

2022 
Stephen Wozniak, "Boil, Toil and Trouble," Whitehot Magazine 
 Charlotte Rickards, "10 Coastal Paintings and Artworks That Aren't Cliche", Country and Town House 
 Jody Zellen, "Fawn Rogers: Your Perfect Plastic Heart," ArtNowLA 
 Rebekah Ludman, "Oysters are fleshy, human-like and sexual in Fawn Rogers’ art," KCRW 
 "Whitehot Recommends: Your Perfect Plastic Heart at Wilding Cran," Whitehot Magazine 
 Lauren Guilford, "Pick of the Week: Fawn Rogers," Artillery 
 Vittoria Benzine, "'The Tenth Muse' at Case Gallery," Whitehot Magazine

2021 
 Kathy Battista, "Fawn Rogers: The World is Your Oyster," Comfort Magazine

2017 
 Marieke Treilhard, "Empathy Through Technology: Re-examining Vulnerability," Artillery 
 Shana Nys Dambrot, "Vulnerability: The Space Between," Riot Material 
 Ralphael Prepetit, "Artist Spotlight: Fawn Rogers," IdiotsGuides 
 Jordan Riefe, "To L.A. Artist Fawn Rogers, Everything Is Nature — Even Her Sculptures," LA Weekly

2016 
 "My Favorite Taco ~ Artist Fawn Rogers," LA Taco 
 Eddie Eng, "52 Artists Partnered to Create This Deck of Contemporary Art Playing Cards," Hypebeast 
 Chloe Dewberry, "Finally, Playing Cards Fit for the Art Collector," Opening Ceremony

2015 
 Lisa Derrick, "'Hero': Fawn Rogers Confronts Andrew Jackson and America's Treatment of Native Americans," HuffPost 
 Jason T. Borbet, "Price Ranges And Studio Images Of 19 Contemporary Artists," Forbes 
 Eric Minh Swenson, "Obtaining Self-Mastery at Frieze Week NYC (PHOTOS)," HuffPost 
 Michelle Lhooq, "Frieze Week Kicks Off With Art World Poker Night," Vice 
 Cait Munro, "Try Doing These 4 Really Cool Things at Select Fair," artnet News 
 "Select Art Fair Events Not to Miss," HAHA Mag 
 Meher McArthur, "The Visible Light Paintings of Fawn Rogers," KCET 
 Lauren Albrecht, "Fawn Rogers' Art World Collector Cards Premier @SelectFair!," Art Nerd New York

References 

Living people
Artists from Los Angeles
Artists from Portland, Oregon
American photographers
21st-century American painters
American women painters
21st-century American women photographers
21st-century American photographers
Year of birth missing (living people)